The Wagoner Tribune is a weekly newspaper in Wagoner, Oklahoma that publishes on Thursday. It is published by Community Publishers Inc., a newspaper and Internet publisher and commercial printer that serves Oklahoma, Missouri and Arkansas. The newspaper was established in 1901 and is currently edited by Travis Sloat.

References

External links
WagonerTribune.com

Newspapers published in Oklahoma
Publications established in 1901